Another Man's Treasure is a mystery-romance novel written by James V. O'Connor and published in August 2011. It follows Ted McCormick, a married home organizer in Albany, New York, as he searches for unknown, highly valuable objects in an old Victorian mansion. While doing so, he fights his growing feelings for another client, a flirtatious divorcee. The book received largely positive reviews for both suspense and realistic emotional relationships.

Plot overview 
The novel is based in Albany, New York. Ted McCormick is a former Chicago stockbroker turned professional home organizer. He's also a devoted husband to his wife, Mary, a beautiful woman he married twelve years before.

The difficult James Smith hires him to clear out all the junk in the cluttered Victorian mansion of his recently deceased father. Smith tells McCormick to look carefully for something of great value within the house, as he suspects his eccentric father hid something.

Ted also begins to fall for one of his clients, a seductive and divorced single mother, Janet Blake. Janet becomes involved in the search for the hidden secret in the mansion, and she and Ted discover a baffling clue. Meanwhile, Ted's wife begins to suspect he is carrying on with Janet, and Janet's jealous ex-husband becomes threatening. Ted eventually ends up making amazing discoveries that effect the entire city.

Publishing history
The book was written by Illinois author James V. O'Connor, who previously published Cuss Control in 2000. It was published by Cincinnati-based Post Mortem Press on August 11, 2011 as an eBook and paperback novel. O'Connor first unveiled the book publicly on September 24, 2011, at a book signing at The Book Stall in Winnetka.

Reception
The Wilmette Beacon said the book had " complex character relationships and mystery-romance style," and the Pioneer Press wrote “Another Man’s Treasure is very entertaining, a book that will make you smile, and one you will likely pass on to a friend.” Other reviews were largely positive, with one stating "James O’Connor brings together all the great crowd-pleasers – romance, suspense and mystery – to make Another Man’s Treasure an unforgettable and exhilarating read." One review called it a story "that deals with work ethics, extramarital affairs and personal integrity."

Writing process
O'Connor described the mystery-suspense novel as " not a how-to book [for home organization], but a tale involving greed and generosity, fidelity and temptation, and the complexity of relationships." He has stated that he placed the book in Albany because of the large number of Victorian mansions. The main house is fictional, but takes place on a real street (Pine). Also, "I needed a city the size of Albany where some of the characters might know of each other or have heard of each other."

Like McCormick, O'Connor is himself a professional home organizer, and runs the company Clutter Control for the Chicago area. He appeared on several national and Chicago television shows about organization, including CBS Sunday Morning and The Early Show.

He has stated, in relation to the main character, an organizer, “When you’re an organizer working closely with people and their personal belongings, you learn a lot about them. Some customers share their emotional needs and reveal family secrets. Organizers must promise confidentiality and avoid getting too involved in their clients’ lives.”

About character creation, he stated "The protagonist thinks and acts the way I do sometimes, and the way I wish I could act other times. The main female character is modeled after an appealing and fun woman I used to know. The other characters just came to me. It was easy." However, he has also stated that neither the situations nor characters in the book are related to his clients or projects.

References

External links

2011 American novels
Novels set in Albany, New York